Leslie Township is a township in Carroll County, in the U.S. state of Missouri.

Leslie Township has the name of Colonel Leslie Combs.

References

Townships in Missouri
Townships in Carroll County, Missouri